Robin Gladwin (born 12 August 1940) is a former English footballer who played as a left-back.

Career
Gladwin began his career in non-league with hometown club Harlow Town, before moving to Cambridge City and Chelmsford City. In January 1966, Gladwin signed for Second Division club Norwich City. Gladwin made 16 Football League appearances during his time at Norwich, before signing for Oxford United, where he played 48 times in all competitions.

References

1940 births
Living people
Association football defenders
English footballers
Sportspeople from Harlow
Harlow Town F.C. players
Cambridge City F.C. players
Chelmsford City F.C. players
Norwich City F.C. players
Oxford United F.C. players
English Football League players